Robert Holmes  was an English politician who sat in the House of Commons  in 1653.

Holmes was a Justice of the Peace of Netherton, Gloucestershire in 1649. In 1653, he was elected Member of Parliament for Gloucestershire in the Barebones Parliament.

Holmes and married Elizabeth Kyrle, daughter of Francis Kyrle.

References

Year of birth missing
Year of death missing
English MPs 1653 (Barebones)
Politicians from Gloucestershire